David Cassidy: Man Undercover (the word "undercover" in the series title appeared at various times written as one word or two) is an American police drama starring David Cassidy, four years after his run starring in The Partridge Family, his first starring role since that series was cancelled. The series was spun off after Cassidy starred in a special two-hour episode of Police Story, titled "A Chance to Live", which aired in May 1978; this episode served as the pilot for Man Undercover.

In A Chance to Live, Cassidy portrayed undercover police officer Dan Shay, a cop who successfully infiltrates a high-school drug ring as a fellow student. Cassidy earned an Emmy Award nomination for Best Dramatic Actor for the role. He reprised the role of Officer Shay for the Man Undercover series, which aired on NBC from November 2, 1978 to July 12, 1979. Only ten episodes of the show aired prior to its cancellation.

The role of Shay's wife, portrayed in "A Chance to Live" by Dee Wallace, was recast with actress Wendy Rastatter for the actual series.

This show is the last new filmed series from Columbia Pictures Television to display a copyright notice at the beginning under the show's logo in the opening credits.

Synopsis
Set in Los Angeles, the series stars Cassidy as undercover police officer Dan Shay. Each episode featured Shay going undercover in a different case. Simon Oakland starred as the head of Shay's undercover team.

The plot of a twenty-something cop going undercover in high school would be used more popularly the following decade in 21 Jump Street.

Episodes

External links
 

1978 American television series debuts
1979 American television series endings
1970s American drama television series
1970s American police procedural television series
NBC original programming
English-language television shows
Fictional portrayals of the Los Angeles Police Department
Television series by Sony Pictures Television
American television spin-offs